Paulo's frog may refer to:

 Paulo's lime tree frog, a frog endemic to Brazil
 Paulo's robber frog, a frog endemic to Brazil